The Team event tournament of the 2012 BWF World Junior Championships was the fourteenth tournament of the BWF World Junior Championships. It was held from October 25–28, 2012 in Chiba, Japan. According to the Badminton World Federation (BWF) 30 teams have confirmed their participation. The winner of the tournament would have Suhandinata Cup for about a year until the next BWF World Junior Championships Team Event is held.

Seedings
The seedings for teams competing in the tournament were released on October 11, 2012. It was based on aggregated points from the best players in the world junior ranking and the result of last year tournament. The tournament was divided into four groups, with Japan and China were the two top seeds, and 2 teams (Malaysia and Korea) in the seeded 3-4 were also put into the same group. another 4 teams were put in the second groups. Eight teams (seeded 9-16) were seeded into third groups and the last sixteen teams were seeded into last groups. The draw was held on the same day in Kuala Lumpur.

Group 1 (Seeded 1-4)

Group 2 (Seeded 5-8)

Group 3 (Seeded 9-16)

Group 4 (Seeded 17-30)

Group stage

Group W1

Group W2

Group X1

Group X2

Group Y1

Group Y2

Group Z1

Group Z2

Knockout stage

Quarter-finals

Japan vs Thailand

South Korea vs Chinese Taipei

Malaysia vs Indonesia

China vs Hong Kong

Semi-final

Japan vs South Korea

Indonesia vs China

Bronze Medal Final

South Korea vs Indonesia

Final

Japan vs China

Final team ranking

 [2]
 [1]
 [3/4]
 [5/8]
 [5/8]
 [3/4]
 [5/8]
 [5/8]
 [9/16]
 [9/16]
 [9/16]
 [9/16]

 [9/16]
 [9/16]
 [9/16]

 [9/16]

References

2012 BWF World Junior Championships
World Junior
2012 in youth sport